Subedar Major and Honorary Captain Yogendra Singh Yadav PVC is a retired commissioned officer in the Indian Army, who was awarded the highest Indian wartime gallantry decoration, the Param Vir Chakra, for his actions during the Kargil War. He is the youngest recipient of the Param Vir Chakra to date, having received it at the age of 19.

Early life
Subedar Major Yadav was born in a Yadav family on 10 May 1980 in Aurangabad Ahir, Bulandshahr District, Uttar Pradesh. His father Karan Singh Yadav served in the Kumaon Regiment, participating in the 1965 and 1971 Indo-Pakistan wars. Yadav joined the Indian Army at 16 years and five months of age.

Career

Kargil War

Yadav enlisted with the 18 Grenadiers, and part of the Ghatak Force commando platoon, tasked to capture three strategic bunkers on Tiger Hill in the early morning hours of 4 July 1999. The bunkers were situated at the top of a vertical, snow-covered,  cliff face. Yadav volunteered to lead the assault, climbed the cliff face, and installed ropes that would allow further assaults on the feature. Halfway up, machine gun and rocket fire came from an enemy bunker, killing the platoon commander and two others. In spite of being hit by multiple bullets in his groin and shoulder, Yadav climbed the remaining  and reached the top. Though severely injured, he crawled to the first bunker and lobbed a grenade, killing four Pakistani soldiers and neutralizing enemy fire. This gave the rest of the platoon the opportunity to climb up the cliff face bunker along with two of his fellow soldiers and engaged in hand-to-hand combat, killing four Pakistani soldiers. The platoon subsequently succeeded in capturing Tiger Hill. Though Yadav was hit by 12 bullets he played a major role in its capture.

The Param Vir Chakra was announced for Yadav posthumously, but it was soon discovered that he was recuperating in a hospital, and it was his namesake who had been slain in the mission.

Later career

Yadav was conferred the honorary rank of Captain by the President of India on Independence Day of 2021. Lieutenant General Rajeev Sirohi, Military Secretary and Colonel of the Grenadiers, presented the rank badges. He retired from army on 31 December, 2021 in the Honorary Captain rank with a traditional send-off.

Subedar Major and Honorary Captain Yogendra Singh Yadav, PVC post-retirement joined the advisory board of udChalo, A consumer technology company working for armed forces personnel.

Param Vir Chakra Citation

The Param Vir Chakra citation on the official Indian Army website reads as follows:

Portrayal in film and media

In the Bollywood film Lakshya (based on the Battle of Tiger Hill), the actions of the fictional war hero Karan Shergill (played by Hrithik Roshan) is a screen adaptation depicting the heroic deeds of Yadav's platoon, among others. It provides a detailed description of their arduous journey to capture the strategically placed bunkers on Tiger Hill.

The assault led by another Ghatak Platoon unit from the same regiment on Tololing was adapted as one of the prominent battle scenes in the Hindi film LOC Kargil. Bollywood actor Manoj Bajpai portrayed the role of Yadav in the film.

Other honours
He joined the show Kaun Banega Crorepati in 2020 on a special invitation from Amitabh Bachchan, along with fellow Param Vir Chakra recipient Subedar Sanjay Kumar. He donated the entire amount (₹2.5 million) won to the Army Welfare Fund.
In the year 2015, he was awarded the state's highest award Yash Bharti by Uttar Pradesh Government for his service towards the country.

References

External links
5 Real Life Soldiers Who Make Rambo Look Like a Pussy
10 Army Heroes and Their Extra Ordinary Tales of Bravery

1980 births
Living people
Indian Army personnel
Recipients of the Param Vir Chakra
People of the Kargil War
People from Bulandshahr district
Indian warriors